Passig is a surname. Notable people with the surname include:

 David Passig (born 1957), Israeli futurist
 Kathrin Passig (born 1970), German writer

See also
 Passi (surname)

Portuguese-language surnames